After the resignation of David Saul Marshall, Lim Yew Hock was appointed by the Governor of Singapore to form the next government. After spent 1 day, he announced his cabinet. His cabinet was similar to that of his predecessor, with some minor changes to the allocation of portfolio. He appointed Abdul Hamid bin Haji Jumat as Deputy Chief Minister.

List of Ministers

The names in bold are the surnames of Chinese persons, and the personal names of Indian and Malay persons

References

 

Executive branch of the government of Singapore
Lists of political office-holders in Singapore
Cabinets established in 1956
Cabinets disestablished in 1959